Pseudobryomima distans is a species of cutworm or dart moth in the family Noctuidae first described by William Barnes and James Halliday McDunnough in 1912. It is found in North America.

The MONA or Hodges number for Pseudobryomima distans is 9598.

References

Further reading

 
 
 

Xylenini
Articles created by Qbugbot
Moths described in 1912